BAP Palacios (DM-73) was a Daring class destroyer in service with the Peruvian Navy. She was completed for the Royal Navy in 1954 as HMS Diana. After being decommissioned she was sold to Peru in 1969 together with her sistership HMS Decoy. She was renamed after Enrique Palacios, a war hero who fought at the Battle of Angamos during the War of the Pacific.

Prior to entering service with the Peruvian Navy she underwent a major refit by Cammell Laird at Birkenhead between 1970 and 1973. Work done during this refit included the following:
 Rebuilding of the foremast for installation of the Plessey AWS-1 air-search radar 
 Installation of eight Exocet MM-38 SSMs in place of the Close Range Blind Fire Director forward of X turret

After its rebuild, Palacios was commissioned into the Peruvian Navy in April 1973. Further work was done on the ship by SIMA dockyards in Callao as follows:
 In 1975-76 the Squid ASW  mortar was removed and a helicopter landing deck fitted.
 In 1977-1978 two OTO Melara Twin 40L70 DARDO compact gun mountings were installed as was an AESN NA-10 gun fire-control system and an AESN RTN-10X fire-control radar. The aft 114 mm turret was replaced with a telescopic hangar.

After serving in two navies for 39 years, Palacios was decommissioned in 1993.

Notes

Sources
 Baker III, Arthur D., The Naval Institute Guide to Combat Fleets of the World 2002-2003. Annapolis: Naval Institute Press, 2002.
 
 Couhat, Jean. Combat Fleets of the World 1982/83. Annapolis: Naval Institute Press, 1982.

Daring-class destroyers (1949) of the Peruvian Navy
Ships built on the River Clyde
1952 ships